Orites lancifolius, commonly known as alpine orites, is a shrub in the family Proteaceae.  It is endemic to south-eastern Australia. The species has a spreading habit and may be a prostrate or up to 2 metres high.  The leaves are 1 to 3 cm long, and 5 to 12 mm wide. White to pale yellow flowers appear between  December and January (early  to mid summer) in its native range. The species was first formally described in 1855 by botanist Ferdinand von Mueller from plant material that he collected "on the rocky summits of the Australian Alps (5-6000 feet high)".

Orites lancifolius occurs in alpine and subalpine areas of New South Wales, the Australian Capital Territory and Victoria in heath and tussock grassland amongst granite rocks.

References

lancifolius
Flora of the Australian Capital Territory
Flora of New South Wales
Flora of Victoria (Australia)
Proteales of Australia
Plants described in 1855
Taxa named by Ferdinand von Mueller